Japan Tikri is a village in the Nicobar district of Andaman and Nicobar Islands, India. It is located in the Nancowry tehsil, on the Katchal Island.

Demographics 

According to the 2011 census of India, Japan Tikri has 116 households. The effective literacy rate (i.e. the literacy rate of population excluding children aged 6 and below) is 67.27%.

References 

Villages in Nancowry tehsil